The Cuban parakeet (Psittacara euops) is a species of parrot in the family Psittacidae that is endemic to the island of Cuba. It was extirpated from the Isla de la Juventud south of Cuba soon after 1900.

Its natural habitats are dry forests, dry savanna, and arable land. The species breeds seasonally, nesting from April to July. It nests in holes in trees or termite nests, particularly those created by the Cuban green woodpecker. Three to five eggs are incubated for around 22 days, and the nestling period is between 45 and 50 days. 
The species was once very common but is now much reduced due to habitat loss and trapping for the cagebird trade. As a consequence it is now listed as vulnerable by the IUCN.

References

External links
BirdLife Species Factsheet.

Cuban parakeet
Endemic birds of Cuba
Cuban parakeet
Taxonomy articles created by Polbot
Species endangered by the pet trade